Integrin-linked kinase is an enzyme that in humans is encoded by the ILK gene involved with integrin-mediated signal transduction. Mutations in ILK are associated with cardiomyopathies. It is a 59kDa protein originally identified in a yeast-two hybrid screen with integrin β1 as the bait protein.  Since its discovery, ILK has been associated with multiple cellular functions including cell migration, proliferation, and adhesion.

Integrin-linked kinases (ILKs) are a subfamily of Raf-like kinases (RAF). The structure of ILK consists of three features: 5 ankyrin repeats in the N-terminus, Phosphoinositide binding motif and extreme N-terminus of kinase catalytic domain. Integrins lack enzymatic activity and depend on adapters to signal proteins. ILK is linked to beta-1 and beta-3 integrin cytoplasmic domains and is one of the best described integrins. Although first described as a serine/threonine kinase by Hannigan, important motifs of ILK kinases are still uncharacterized. ILK is thought to have a role in development regulation and tissue homeostasis, however it was found that in flies, worms and mice ILK activity isn’t required to regulate these processes.

Animal ILKs have been linked to the pinch- parvin complex which control muscle development. Mice lacking ILK were embryonic lethal due to lack of organized muscle cell development. In mammals ILK lacks catalytic activity but supports scaffolding protein functions for focal adhesions.  In plants, ILKs signal complexes to focal adhesion sites. ILKs of plants contain multiple ILK genes. Unlike animals that contain few ILK genes ILKs have been found to possess oncogenic properties. ILKs control the activity of serine/threonine phosphatases.

Principle Features 

Transduction of extracellular matrix signals through integrins influences intracellular and extracellular functions, and appears to require interaction of integrin cytoplasmic domains with cellular proteins. Integrin-linked kinase (ILK), interacts with the cytoplasmic domain of beta-1 integrin. Multiple alternatively spliced transcript variants encoding the same protein have been found for this gene. Recent results showed that the C-terminal kinase domain is actually a pseudo-kinase with adaptor function.

In 2008, ILK was found to localize to the centrosome and regulate mitotic spindle organization.

Integrin-linked kinase has been shown to interact with:

 ACP6,
 AKT1, 
 ILKAP,  and
 LIMS1,

Function of Plant ILK1 

ILKs function by interacting with the many transmembrane receptors to regulate different signaling cascades. ILK1 has been found in the root system of most plants where they are co-localized on the plasma membrane and endoplasmic reticulum where they transport ions across the plasma membrane ILK1 is responsible for the control of osmotic and salt stress, control of the uptake of nutrients based on availability and pathogen detection.

Osmotic and salt stress 

ILK1 is linked to hyperosmotic stress sensitivity. ILK1 reduced salt stress in seedlings placed in solution with increased concentrations of salt. ILK1 concentrations remain fairly constant throughout development regardless of a high salt exposure. Previously, it was believed that K+ accumulation was reduced in increased salt concentration.  K+ homeostasis is not affected in high salt concentrations. During periods of high salt stress, K+ concentrations in the presence of ILK1 was maintained at the existing level. Potassium transport is required for flg22 root growth inhibition and potassium transport was affected by flg22.

Potassium levels modulate the activation of flg22, a flagellin peptide composed of 22 amino acids that triggers pathogen-associated molecular patterns (PAMPs). PAMPs functions by activating regulators of bacterial pathogen alert system. Ion concentration levels of Mn2+, Mg2+, S and Ca2+ were also affected after PAMP regulators were mobilized.

Nutrient uptake 
Potassium (K+) is responsible for osmoregulation, membrane potential maintenance and turgor pressure of plant cells which in turn mediates stomata movement and growth of tubules within the plant. Photosynthesis and other metabolic pathways are controlled by potassium. When sufficient K+ uptake is not met, PAMPs are activated. Calmodulins, specifically CML9, have appeared as important genes to interact with ILK1 and regulate potassium levels within the cell. While CLM9 primarily regulates Ca2+ it is linked to a yet identified K+/Ca2+ influx channel.  While interactions are known to occur between CML9 and ILK1, ILK1 Is not a direct phosphorylation target of CML9. With the addition of CML9, autophosphorylation of ILK1 is diminished, the present irrespective of calcium available for uptake.

ILK1 is also affected by presence or absence of manganese (Mn2+). Autophosphorylation and substrate phosphorylation occurred when exposed to both Mn2+ and Mg2+. Mn2+ and was dose dependent where Mg2+ was not. Specific ILK autophosphorylation sites were found in the presence of Mn2+ but not in the presence of Mg2+ which supports the ILK1 dependent phosphorylation suggested above. Mass spectrometry revealed no other kinases were present to trigger this response.

Pathogen detection 

ILK1 has been found to promote resistance in bacterial pathogens. ILK1 is required for flg22 sensitivity in seedlings. A catalytically inactive version of ILK1 was compared with catalytically active versions of ILK1 to see the level of resistance when challenged with bacterial pathogens. Plants inoculated with inactive ILK1 were more susceptible to bacterial infection than active ILK1 suggesting that ILK1 is needed for bacterial pathogen detection. While ILK1 is involved in bacterial pathogen detection it is not used for effect induced defenses.

ILK1 increases PAMP response and basal immunity through phosphorylation of MPK3 and MPK6 and operates independently in reactive oxygen species (ROS) production. High Affinity Potassium uptake mediators such as HAK5 have also been found to be integral in the signaling of flg22. HAK5 function when potassium levels are low. Flg22 has been shown to depolarize the cell’s plasma membrane with HAK5 and ILK1 working together to mediate ion homeostasis to assist with both short and long term actions such as growth and suppression thereof.

References

Further reading 

 
 
 
 
 
 
 
 
 
 
 
 
 
 
 

Proteins